Ancylosis yerburii is a species of snout moth in the genus Ancylosis. It was described by Arthur Gardiner Butler in 1884 and is known from Iran, Yemen, Algeria, Tunisia, Libya, Morocco, Egypt, Saudi Arabia, Bahrain, Israel, Palestine, Jordan, Sudan and Cyprus

The larvae feed on Limoniastrum guyonianum and Statice pruinosa.

References

Moths described in 1884
yerburii
Moths of the Arabian Peninsula
Moths of Africa
Moths of the Middle East